Word On The Street was a street newspaper in Baltimore, Maryland.

The newspaper was managed "by people who have experienced homelessness in the past or are still surviving on the street." The organization aimed to have 75 percent of the content written by the homeless community.

Editor-in-Chief Mark Schumann experienced homelessness himself for many years.

Vending
Word on the Street was sold by individuals for a suggested donation of $1.  Each vendor then purchased new papers at 25 cents apiece.

Affiliations
Word on the Street was a member of the North American Street Newspaper Association and International Network of Street Papers.

References

External links 
 Word On the Street Official Website

Street newspapers
Newspapers published in Baltimore
Organizations based in Baltimore
Homelessness in the United States
Publications established in 2012
2012 establishments in Maryland